Mansonia is the scientific name of two genera of organisms and may refer to:

Mansonia (fly), a genus of insects in the family Culicidae
Mansonia (plant), a genus of plants in the family Malvaceae